Carmen Moscariello is an Italian poet.

Biography 
A pupil of Raffaello Franchini, she was an ordinary Italiano and Latino 42 years dedicated as teacher. Poetess, playwright, director, she obtained the title for La Regia with Roberto Tessari at the Università degli studi di Roma "La Sapienza", publicist journalist. Corresponding for Il Tempo (1987–1996), she published about 1,500 articles in this newspaper, following delicate investigations on Tangentopoli, on the phenomenon of usury, on the Garigliano nuclear power station and on the Camorra. She was a correspondent for TG3 Lazio. She is the president and founder of the "Tulliola Renato Filippelli" international poetry Filippelli". She received non-fiction and journalism prize in XXVI edition, prize rewarded with a medal by the President of the Republic Giorgio Napolitano for her high cultural merits. She is president of the "Legality against the Mafia" Award (VII edition).
She wrote articles for "Oggi e Domani", Avvenire, poetic frequencies; Il Convivio; Culture there perspective and countless other literary newspapers.
In 1999, she was the director and founder of the monthly political and culture magazine "Il Levriero". 
Syndicalist of the UNAMS (National Union of Musicians and Artists), organized a Rome and throughout Lazio important painting exhibitions, concerts and conferences cultural. He has published works of poetry, theater, non-fiction, art.

In 2020, Aula Magna of the high school Coreutico Suor Orsola Benincasa of Naples presentation of the book "Modigliani l'anima dipinta".

Bibliography 
Friedric Holderlin, tra Lirica e Filosofia , Lucarini Editore; Roma 1988. 
"Testimonianze su Franco Ferrara, Imiziad e lettere a Natascia" Risposte, Salerno, 1989.
"Gli occhi frugano il vento" Bastogi Editrice Italiana, Foggia, 1999.
"Poesie, «Oggi e Domani", EDIARS, Pescara, 1994. 
Il presente della memoria”, Publiscoop Editore, Sessa Aurunca, 1994.  
”Proserpina. Tre atti preceduti da un preludio” Bastogi Editrice Italiana, 2003.  
”Elelonora dalle belle mani. Dialogo segreto tra Eleonora Duse e Gabriele D'Annunzio. Opera drammatica in tre atti” Bastogi Editrice Italiana, Foggia, 2005,  
”Giordano Bruno. Sorgente di fuoco” Guida Editori, Napoli, 2011  
”Non è tempo per il Messia” Guida Editori, Napoli, 2012 
”Oboe per flauto traverso. Parole per Ugo Piscopo” Guida Editori, Napoli, 2012 
”Ugo Piscopo terra della sera. Visioni” Editore Guida, 2014 
”L'orologio smarrito” Guida Editori, Napoli, 2014 
”Tunnel dei sogni” Il Convivio edizioni, 2016 
” Destini sincronici Amelia Rosselli e Rocco Scotellaro . Con lettere di Rocco Scotellaro e Michele Prisco” Guida Editori, Napoli, 2015 
 ”Modigliani. L’anima Dipinta. ” Gangemi Editore, Roma, 2019

References 

1950 births
Living people
Italian women poets
20th-century Italian poets
20th-century Italian women writers